Mission: Magic! is an American Saturday morning animated series starring rock star Rick Springfield and is a spin-off of The Brady Kids, produced by Filmation. 16 episodes aired on ABC from September 8 to December 12, 1973. It was also broadcast in Springfield's native Australia, where Springfield was then a bigger celebrity.

The show involved Miss Tickle, a magical teacher who could transport her students to fantasy realms through her magic blackboard.

Characters and format
Even though Springfield still spoke with a pronounced Australian accent in the mid-1970s, he provided his own voice for his animated doppelgänger. On the show, Springfield always wore white pants and a white sweater which sported on the front an encircled lowercase "r" with a lightning bolt in the background; this design was taken from the back cover of his 1973 album Comic Book Heroes.

Springfield was joined by a cast of characters:
 Miss Tickle, a bubbly teacher who was secretly an expert on magic (her name was a pun on the word "mystical")
and six teenaged students:
 Kim, an Asian girl, who is the leader of “The Adventurers Club”
 Vinnie, who spoke with a thick New York accent and often confused elaborate words
 Carol, a blonde girl who had a crush on Springfield
 Socks, a quirky Jughead-like character who wore a light blue hat
 Franklin, a black athlete
 Harvey, a short, stocky and bespectacled nerd

They were involved in a weekly after-school group called “The Adventurers Club,” although it's debatable whether the organization was a social club or an actual class, as Miss Tickle often incorporated various school subjects into the group's adventures. In the first episode, the Club was visited in class by the school principal Mr. Samuels, who knew nothing of Miss Tickle's magical abilities.

Almost every Mission: Magic! adventure began by Rick communicating with the Club via an enchanted gramophone telling them where he was and either inviting them to come along, or transmitting a distress message of some form. Miss Tickle would aim her magic ring at Tut Tut, a ceramic cat on her desk who would come to life after Miss Tickle recited the incantation:
"O Tut Tut, cat of ancient lore,
"'Tis time to draw the magic door."
After drawing a magic door on the blackboard, Miss Tickle, Tut Tut and the students would fly through the door and meet up with Springfield and his familiar, an owl named Ptolemy. In their travels to otherworldly lands and times, they would solve mysteries, fix problems, or help people in need. At the middle or end of each show, Springfield performed a song, its lyrics often tying into the message of that week's story. An album with most of the songs from the series was released in 1974, followed by a CD version in 2004.

Although Mission: Magic! was primarily intended to promote Springfield's teen idol status in America, the cartoon itself would be a forerunner for the 1990s PBS series, The Magic School Bus, in which Lily Tomlin provided the voice of teacher Miss Frizzle. Both shows featured red-headed, magic-wielding teachers, with students from diverse ethnicities and backgrounds, and both shows combined entertainment and education. In each weekly episode, both school groups would magically transcend time and space to go on new adventures.

Ironically, Springfield himself eschewed this series years later, claiming that it "scarred me for life."

Cast
 Lola Fisher as Miss Tickle
 Howard Morris as Socks, Vinnie, Mr. Samuels
 Erika Scheimer as Kim, Carol 
 Lane Scheimer as Harvey, Franklin 
 Rick Springfield as himself

Episodes

NOTE: All the main songs appearing in the series were written and performed by Rick Springfield. Each song runs about 90 seconds, edited or faded from the versions later released on the 1974 soundtrack album.

Soundtrack album

Mission: Magic! is the third solo studio album by Australian musician Rick Springfield, and is an almost complete song soundtrack to the 1973 cartoon series. Only about 90 seconds of each song was used in the TV show, but the album contains the full-length versions of every song from the series, except for episode 5's song and episode 15's second song which was the only one in the series sung by Miss Tickle, not Springfield. None of the show's score, incidental music or Miss Tickle's brief melodic incantations were included. The album was released in 1974 several months after the TV series' initial run had finished, and only in Australia, even though the cartoon was produced in the United States. Possibly because of rights issues, no song from Mission: Magic! has ever appeared on any of the many official Rick Springfield compilation albums.

All songs on the album were written by Rick Springfield.

 "We're Gonna Have a Good Time" (2:39)
 "It's Driving Me Crazy" (2:55)
 "Free and Easy" (2:38)
 "You Can Do It (If You Try)" (2:57)
 "On the Other Side" (2:22)
 "You Can't Judge a Book" (2:37)
 "Love Is the Key" (2:29)
 "You'd Better Think Twice" (2:13)
 "Welcome to the Rodeo" (2:49)
 "I Want You" (2:39)
 "Just Gotta Sing" (2:30)
 "If We Help One Another" (2:33)
 "Starlight, Starbright" (2:03)
 "Catch Me If You Can" (2:17)
 "I Know That It's Magic" (2:17)
 "Theme from Mission: Magic!" (2:22)

Total Running Time: 40:20

Re-releases
The Mission: Magic! album has been re-released in various years and territories under the following titles:
 Just Gotta Sing (K-Tel) - only 13 tracks
 Big Hits (Premore) - only 10 tracks
 Backtracks (Renaissance Records; 1999) - all 16 tracks
 Speak to the Sky (Laserlight; 2001) - only 9 tracks plus "Speak to the Sky" (1972)
 Catch Me If You Can (Renaissance Records; 2006) - all 16 tracks plus "Take a Hand" (1976) and "Speak to the Sky"
 Fan-Tastic Rick Springfield (Ba-ba; 2009) - all 16 tracks
 Rick Springfield (Suite 201; 2009) - all 16 tracks

Home media
BCI Eclipse LLC (under its Ink & Paint classic animation entertainment label), under license from Entertainment Rights, released Mission: Magic! - The Complete Series on DVD in Region 1 on May 8, 2007. The 2-disc set includes all 16 episodes, uncut and digitally remastered for optimum audio and video quality, and presented in its original broadcast presentation and original production order. The 2-Disc set also includes many special features.

References

External links
 
 
 Toonarific: "Mission: Magic"

American children's animated fantasy television series
American Broadcasting Company original programming
1970s American animated television series
1973 American television series debuts
1975 American television series endings
American animated television spin-offs
Television series by Filmation
English-language television shows